The chestnut-breasted coronet (Boissonneaua matthewsii) is a species of hummingbird in the "brilliants", tribe Heliantheini in subfamily Lesbiinae. It is found in Colombia, Ecuador, and Peru.

Taxonomy and systematics

The chestnut-breasted coronet shares genus Boissonneaua with two other coronets, the buff-tailed (B. flavescens) and velvet-purple (B. jardini). It is monotypic.

Description

Both sexes have a short, straight, black bill, a white spot behind the eye, and a notched tail. Males have metallic green upperparts. Their throat has yellowish green speckles on a buff base and the rest of the underparts are reddish chestnut with some green speckles on the flanks. The central tail feathers are bronzy and the rest reddish chestnut with bronzy tips. The female's plumage is almost identical, but with somewhat paler underparts and less speckling on the throat.

Distribution and habitat

The chestnut-breasted coronet is found from extreme southeastern Colombia south along the east slope of the Andes through Ecuador and Peru as far as Cuzco Department. It also occurs on the west slope of the Andes from central Ecuador into northwestern Peru. It inhabits the interior and edges of humid montane forest and also gardens near the forest.

Behavior

Movement

The chestnut-breasted coronet's movements, if any, have not been documented.

Feeding

The chestnut-breasted coronet is highly territorial and defends clusters of flowers from other nectar-feeding birds. It typically forages from the mid-story to the canopy. It feeds by clinging to the flower, holding its wings open for a second or two after landing. In addition to feeding on nectar it captures small insects by hawking from a perch.

Breeding

The chestnut-breasted coronet's breeding phenology has not been described. It is assumed to make a cup nest like other closely-related hummingbirds.

Vocalization

One description of chestnut-breasted coronet vocalizations is "a high, thin, liquid tip, a rapid, sweet trill, and various squeaky notes."

Status

The IUCN has assessed the chestnut-breasted coronet as being of Least Concern. It has a large range, but its population size and trend are not known. No immediate threats have been identified. It is considered uncommon to fairly common in Ecuador and uncommon to common in Peru. "Human activity has little short-term direct effect on Chestnut-breasted Coronet, other than the local effects of habitat destruction".

References

External links

Photo-Medium Res; Article chandra.as.utexas.edu
Chestnut-breasted Coronet photo gallery VIREO

chestnut-breasted coronet
Birds of the Ecuadorian Andes
Birds of the Peruvian Andes
chestnut-breasted coronet
chestnut-breasted coronet
Taxonomy articles created by Polbot